Waldon is a former census-designated place (CDP) in Contra Costa County, California, United States. The population was 5,133 at the 2000 census. It is served by  station on the Bay Area Rapid Transit (BART) , and by Interstate 680. The area has been undergoing a series of transit-oriented development projects under the auspices of the Contra Costa Centre Transit Village public/private partnership.

Waldon's territory has been assumed by Contra Costa Centre CDP for the 2010 census.

Geography

All addresses in Waldon were actually served as Walnut Creek, by the USPS.

Demographics
At the 2000 census there were 5,133 people, 3,086 households, and 1,018 families living in the CDP. The racial makeup of the CDP was 75.43% White, 2.05% Black or African American, 0.33% Native American, 15.72% Asian, 0.25% Pacific Islander, 2.24% from other races, and 3.97% from two or more races.  6.18% of the population were Hispanic or Latino of any race.
Of the 3,086 households 10.4% had children under the age of 18 living with them, 26.5% were married couples living together, 4.6% had a female householder with no husband present, and 67.0% were non-families. 53.3% of households were one person and 10.5% were one person aged 65 or older.  The average household size was 1.66 and the average family size was 2.49.

The age distribution was 9.5% under the age of 18, 8.7% from 18 to 24, 49.8% from 25 to 44, 18.9% from 45 to 64, and 13.1% 65 or older.  The median age was 35 years. For every 100 females, there were 94.5 males.  For every 100 females age 18 and over, there were 91.9 males.

The median household income was $58,552 and the median family income  was $73,869. Males had a median income of $55,000 versus $45,878 for females. The per capita income for the CDP was $41,093.  About 3.5% of families and 5.5% of the population were below the poverty line, including 1.3% of those under age 18 and 4.5% of those age 65 or over.

References

External links
 Census map of Waldon
 Contra Costa Centre Transit Village

Former census-designated places in California